Vanity Fair is a 2018 historical drama miniseries based on the 1848 novel of the same name by William Makepeace Thackeray. It was produced by Mammoth Screen and distributed by ITV and Amazon Studios.

The series stars Olivia Cooke as Becky Sharp, Tom Bateman as Captain Rawdon Crawley, Claudia Jessie as Amelia Sedley, and Michael Palin as the author William Makepeace Thackeray.

Cast

Main
 Olivia Cooke as Becky Sharp, the daughter of a French opera singer and an artist father. Sharp is a cynical social climber who uses her charms to fascinate and seduce upper-class men.
 Claudia Jessie as Amelia Sedley, a good-natured naive young girl, of a wealthy London family who is Becky's friend from Miss Pinkerton's academy and invites Becky to stay in her London home following their graduation from the academy.
 Tom Bateman as Rawdon Crawley, an empty-headed cavalry officer, younger of the two Crawley sons and favourite of their Aunt Matilda, until he marries Becky Sharp, a woman of a far lower class.
 Johnny Flynn as William Dobbin, colonel of the City Light Horse regiment and the best friend of George Osborne, who feels unrequited love for Amelia.
 Charlie Rowe as George Osborne, son of merchant John Osborne and childhood sweetheart, later husband, of Amelia, who defies his father to marry his love.
 Simon Russell Beale as Mr. John Sedley, Amelia and Jos's father and Louisa's husband who goes bankrupt.
 Anthony Head as Lord Steyne, a rich and powerful marquis who is attracted to Becky.
 Martin Clunes as Sir Pitt Crawley, a crude and profligate baronet who hired Becky as governess to his daughters before seeking to marry her, and then discovering she has become secretly engaged to his second son, Rawdon.
 Frances de la Tour as Lady Matilda Crawley, the wealthy aunt of the Crawley sons.
 Mathew Baynton as Bute Crawley, Rawdon's Christian brother.
 Sian Clifford as Martha Crawley, Bute's spouse.
 Robert Pugh as Mr. John Osborne, George's father who forbids him from marrying Amelia.
 Suranne Jones as Miss Pinkerton, snobbish and cold-hearted headmistress of the academy which Amelia and Becky used to attend.
 David Fynn as Jos Sedley, Collector in India and Amelia's brother who has an initial attraction to Becky.
 Felicity Montagu as Arabella Briggs, servant to Lady Matilda, and later Becky.
 Claire Skinner as Mrs. Louisa Sedley, Amelia and Joss's mother and John's wife.
 Michael Palin as William Makepeace Thackeray, the author of Vanity Fair and narrator of the series.

Recurring

 Mike Grady as Horrocks
 Lauren Crace as Betsy Horrocks
 Ellie Kendrick as Jane Osborne
 Elizabeth Berrington as Lady Bareacres
 Sally Phillips as Lady Steyne
 Richard Dixon as General Tuffo
 Peter Wight as Mr Raggles
 Patrick FitzSymons as Major Michael O'Dowd
 Monica Dolan as Mrs. Peggy O'Dowd
 Niamh Durkin as Rose Crawley
 Rafferty Railton as Rawdy Crawley
 Richie Campbell as Sam

Episodes

Production 
A cottage on Chevening House Estate, Sevenoaks in Kent featured as Rawdon Crawley's cottage. Squerryes Court, Sevenoaks, was used for the interiors of Miss Pinkerton's school. A scene on the promenade, featuring soldiers and horses, was shot outside the Royal Hotel in Deal, Kent. Further filming took place at Chatham Historic Dockyard, where various London street scenes were shot outside the Ropery, an embarkation to France was shot on Anchor Wharf, and the interior of the Commissioner's House was also used.

Critical reception 
The series was met with a positive response from critics for its sets and Olivia Cooke's performance. On the review aggregation website Rotten Tomatoes, the series holds a 88% with an average rating of 7.08 out of 10 based on 33 reviews. The website's critical consensus reads, "Olivia Cooke's brilliant portrayal of the feisty and scheming Becky Sharp in Vanity Fair makes this adaptation of Thackeray's classic novel more relatable for a 21st century audience." On Metacritic, the film has a weighted average score of 66 out of 100, based on 7 critics, indicating "generally favorable reviews".

Following the conclusion of the series and on writing about the series's significantly low viewing figures in comparison to the BBC One "ratings juggernaut" Bodyguard, Ben Dowell of the Radio Times praised Cooke's performance, writing that "of all the TV Beckys down the ages – Joyce Redman, Susan Hampshire, Eve Matheson, Natasha Little, not to mention Reese Witherspoon in the 2004 film – Cooke is definitely one of the best we’ve ever had." Newsday's Verne Gay was more critical of the show, calling it both "faithful and faithless" to the book and concluded that the series "can occasionally feel like a homework assignment." Matthew Gilbert, writing for The Boston Globe, was more positive, stating that "If you’re a fan of these adaptations...I think you’ll find something pleasing in this “Vanity Fair” — not heroes and heroines stirring about waiting for their happy endings, of course, but something far more scandalous and universal."

References

External links
 

2018 British television series debuts
2018 British television series endings
2010s British drama television series
2010s British television miniseries
Television series set in the 19th century
Films based on Vanity Fair (novel)
ITV television dramas
Television series by Amazon Studios
Television series by ITV Studios
Television series by Mammoth Screen
English-language television shows